Gessner Harrison "Hatch" Echols Jr. (May 1, 1933 – April 11, 1993) was an American molecular biologist, biochemist, and geneticist, whose work on the lambda phage advanced the understanding of viral infections and gene regulation inside the cell.

Early life and education 
Harrison Echols was born in Charlottesville, Virginia in 1933, and graduated in 1955 from the University of Virginia, where his grandfather William Holding Echols had been an influential professor of mathematics. He had initially intended to become a writer but ultimately completed his BA, MA, and PhD in physics. 

He earned his PhD in 1959 from the University of Wisconsin, Madison, where he would subsequently return as a professor the following year.

Research and career 
In 1959, Echols was first introduced to genetics as a postdoctoral student at Cyrus Levinthal's lab at MIT, where he uncovered the mechanism of regulation of the bacterial enzyme alkaline phosphatase. In contrast to Francois Jacob and Jacques Monod's 1960 operon theory that prescribed a single repressor model for regulation, Echols discovered that there were two separate genes acting on the enzyme: one positively (to promote) and one negatively (to repress).

After completing his postdoctoral work, he returned to the University of Wisconsin, Madison as professor of biochemistry, where he taught from 1960 to 1969. He spent the remainder of his life as a professor of molecular biology at the University of California, Berkeley, from 1969 to 1993, chairing the Department of Molecular Biology from 1978 to 1980.

Echols was an early pioneer in scientific ethics, teaching courses on the subject long before it was common practice. In 1970 at a Phage Group meeting, he laid out a proposal for a more collaborative approach to science, wherein each paper in a given field would be coauthored by all scientists working in that field, so that scientific publications would better reflect the communal nature of science.

Areas of study 

At the University of Wisconsin, Echols began to study the lambda phage – in particular, the regulatory processes that determined when the phage would follow the lytic cycle or lysogenic cycle based on its conditions, continuing the work on gene regulation that he had begun with his study of alkaline phosphatase at MIT. 

Echols also performed pioneering work in determining how phage DNA moves in and out of a host cell's DNA during infection. According to Randy Schekman, "these studies were influential in suggesting how certain human tumor viruses may combine with a cell's chromosome."

Later in his career, Echols became interested in factors controlling fidelity of DNA replication and the SOS response caused by DNA damage. He spent a sabbatical year in 1981–1982 in Arthur Kornberg's group at Stanford University, where he gained experience with the then-novel approaches of enzymology and electron microscopy. Using his broad palette of techniques, he wrote a number of papers of "virtuosic science" starting in 1982 studying DNA polymerase III and SOS mutagenesis.

Honors 

In 1981, Echols was awarded the Guggenheim Fellowship. In 1991, he was elected a Member of the National Academy of Sciences.

Personal life 
Echols was married four times, and at the time of his death was married to cell biologist Carol Gross. He had four children with his first wife, Jean Crutchfield: Cathy, Elizabeth, Jean, and Robert.

Echols was an accomplished tennis player. He played tennis at University of Virginia and won multiple trophies at a Madison, Wisconsin tournament in 1961. Mark Ptashne recounts a tennis match against Echols:

The Hatch Echols Memorial Tennis Tournament is held in his honor every year at the Molecular Genetics of Bacteria and Phages Meeting at the University of Wisconsin, Madison.

Echols died of lung cancer on April 11, 1993, in Berkeley, California.

Selected works 
 Operators and Promoters: The Story of Molecular Biology and Its Creators (written 1986–1992, published 2001), a narrative history of molecular biology, edited by Carol Gross after Echols's death and published posthumously

References 

American molecular biologists
American biochemists
University of California, Berkeley faculty
University of Wisconsin–Madison faculty
Members of the United States National Academy of Sciences
Cell biologists
Phage workers